Seizō, Seizo, Seizou or Seizoh (written: 精三, 省三 or せいぞう in hiragana) is a masculine Japanese given name. Notable people with the name include:

, Japanese actor
, Japanese voice actor
, Imperial Japanese Navy admiral and Governor-General of Taiwan
, Japanese horticulturist
, Japanese manga artist and illustrator

Japanese masculine given names